Apátistvánfalva is a village in Vas County, Hungary.

Notable residents
 Károly Krajczár (born 1936), Hungarian Slovene teacher
 Ferenc Marics (1791–1844), Hungarian teacher
 Antal Stevanecz (1861–1921), Hungarian Slovene teacher and writer
 Iren Pavlics (1934–2022), Hungarian Slovene author and editor

Populated places in Vas County
Hungarian Slovenes